Chen Yu Ping is a Chinese Paralympic sitting volleyball player. She is part of the China women's national sitting volleyball team.

She competed at the 2004 Paralympic Games.

References

Living people
Volleyball players at the 2004 Summer Paralympics
Paralympic competitors for China
Chinese women's volleyball players
Women's sitting volleyball players
Medalists at the 2004 Summer Paralympics
Year of birth missing (living people)
Chinese sitting volleyball players
Paralympic medalists in volleyball
Paralympic gold medalists for China
21st-century Chinese women